Ivan Kmotrík (born 14 April 1959, in Skalica) is a Slovak businessman, mostly known for his involvement in the ŠK Slovan Bratislava football club. He is also owner of Grafobal group, TV channel TA3, OMS Lighting, and university Stredoeurópska vysoká škola v Skalici.

References

External links
Leaders.sk profil

Slovak businesspeople
Living people
1959 births